A timeline of notable events relating to BBC Radio News.

1920s
1922
18 October – The British Broadcasting Company is formed.
14 November – First BBC broadcasts from London (station 2LO) and the opening day saw the broadcast of the very first BBC News bulletin. Wishing to avoid competition, newspaper publishers persuaded the government to ban the BBC from broadcasting news before 7pm and to force it to use wire service copy instead of reporting on its own.

1923
No events.

1924
No events.

1925
No events.

1926
4 May – The General strike begins and the BBC broadcasts five news bulletins a day as no newspapers are published.

1927
No events.

1928
No events.

1929
6 March – Week in Westminster is broadcast for the first time.

1930s
1930
No events.

1931
No events.

1932
No events.

1933
No events.

1934
Following it gaining the right to edit its own bulletins, the BBC creates its own news operation.

1935
No events.

1936
No events.

1937
No events.

1938
3 January – The BBC begins broadcasting its first foreign-language radio service, in Arabic.

1939
Creation of BBC Monitoring.

1940s
1940
11 May – The BBC starts a news service in Hindi.

1941
No events.

1942
No events.

1943
No events.

1944
 No events.

1945
9 October – The first edition of Today in Parliament is broadcast.

1946
BBC Radio bulletins began to be began simulcast on television with a still picture of Big Ben.

1947
No events.

1948
12 October – The first edition of Any Questions? is broadcast, initially broadcast as a six-week fortnightly series, a six-programme series on West of England Home Service.

 1949
September – Any Questions? becomes a weekly programme, still broadcast for the West Country but with a national repeat six days later.

1950s
 1950
 September –  Any Questions? starts being broadcast live across the UK on the BBC Light Programme with the repeat on the Home Service.

 1951
 No events.

 1952
 No events.

 1953
 2 June – The coronation of Queen Elizabeth II in Westminster Abbey is broadcast by the BBC and is broadcast on both the Home Service and on The Light Programme.

 1954
 October – Any Answers? a feedback spin-off from Any Questions?, is broadcast on the Home Service for the first time.

 1955
 The first edition of From Our Own Correspondent is broadcast.

1956
No events.

1957
28 October – The Today programme is broadcast on the Home Service for the first time. It is intended as an alternative series of “topical talks”, broadcast as an alternative to light music. It is broadcast in two 20-minute slots.

1958
No events.

1959
No events.

1960s
 1960
 19 September – A new evening news and comment programme called Ten O’Clock debuts on the Home Service.

 1961
 No events.

 1962
 No events.

 1963
 31 August – The Today programme becomes part of the BBC's current affairs department and starts to adopt a more newsier format.

 1964
 No events.

 1965
 4 October – The World at One is broadcast on the Home Service for the first time.

 1966
 No events.

1967
 17 September – The World This Weekend is broadcast on the Home Service for the first time.
 30 September – BBC Radio 1 is launched and a news service of bulletins on the half-hour, as opposed to on the hour is created for the new station. At the same time, the Light Programme, the third network (Network Three / the Third Programme) and the Home Service are renamed Radios 2, 3 and 4 respectively.

1968
No events.

1969
 10 July – The BBC publishes a report called "Broadcasting in the Seventies" proposing the reorganisation of programmes on the national networks and replacing regional broadcasting on BBC Radio 4 with BBC Local Radio.

1970s
1970
 3 April – For the first time, both airings of Any Questions are broadcast on Radio 4. Previously, the station had only broadcast the Saturday repeat as the Friday night debut broadcast had been on BBC Radio 2.
 6 April – The first editions of PM and The World Tonight are broadcast on Radio 4.
 10 April – The first broadcast of a new news and current affairs programme Analysis.

1971
 No events.

1972
 No events.

1973
 10 September – Newsbeat bulletins air on BBC Radio 1 for the first time.

1974
 No events.

1975
 9 June – Proceedings in the Parliament of the United Kingdom are broadcast on radio for the first time.

1976
 No events.

1977
 2 May – BBC Radio 4 launches a new breakfast programme Up to the Hour. Consequently, The Today Programme is reduced from a continuous two-hour programme to two 25-minute slots.
2 October – The first edition of personal finance programme Money Box is broadcast.

1978
 3 April – Permanent radio broadcasts of proceedings in the House of Commons begin. Radio 4 marks the first day with an afternoon of live coverage. The station goes on to broadcast Prime Minister's Questions for the next year.
 3 July – After just over a year on air, Up to the Hour is cancelled. Consequently, Today once again becomes a continuous two-hour programme. Also, a new weekday 6am News Briefing is introduced.

1979
 No events.

1980s
1980
 Summer – Due to the continued expansion of BBC Local Radio, regional news bulletins on Radio 4 end, apart from in the south west as this is now the only part of England still without any BBC local station.

1981
 No events.

1982
31 December – The last regional opt-out programming on Radio 4 ends when the final edition of Morning Sou'West is broadcast ahead of the forthcoming launch of BBC Radio Devon and BBC Radio Cornwall.

1983
1 February – In Business is broadcast on Radio 4 for the first time.

1984
No events.

1985
No events.
1986
No events.

1987
3 January – The Today programme is extended to six days a week when it launches a Saturday edition.
 9 February – The 9am and 5pm news bulletins on BBC Radio 3 are replaced by a ten-minute bulletin from the BBC World Service. The bulletins are titled World Service News.

1988
15 January – After less than a year, the World Service news bulletins broadcast on Radio 3 are axed.
June – After 66 years at Broadcasting House, the BBC Radio News operation moves to BBC Television Centre.

1989
No events.

1990s
1990
8 January –  A new 30-minute news programme News 90 replaces the teatime edition of Newsbeat on Radio 1.

1991
 17 January–2 March – Radio 4 News FM, the first rolling BBC radio news service is on air during the first Gulf War. It broadcasts on BBC Radio 4’s FM frequencies with the regular scheduled service continuing on long wave.

1992
 late March-7 April – For the first time, Radio 4 long wave opts out of the main Radio 4 schedule. It does so to provide additional coverage of the latest developments in the general election campaign. Previously, additional news coverage had been broadcast on FM.
 15 October – The BBC announces plans to launch a continuous news service on BBC Radio 4’s long wave frequency. The date of 5 April 1994 is set as the launch date. The plan would result in Radio 4 broadcasting exclusively on FM.

1993
There is widespread opposition to the BBC's plans to launch a rolling news service on Radio 4’s long wave frequency, not least due to Radio 4 still not being universally available on FM. The proposals to launch the service on long wave are dropped.

1994
 10 January – The teatime edition of Newsbeat returns to Radio 1 after four years away. The bulletin airs in its old slot, 5:30pm to 5:45pm.  
 24 March – The Financial World Tonight is broadcast on Radio 4 for the final time, ahead of its move to the new news and sport station BBC Radio 5 Live.
 28 March – At 5am, BBC Radio 5 Live launches. The new 24-hour station replaces the old service's educational and children's programmes with a new rolling news service, whilst retaining the sports programmes from the old Radio 5.

1995
 27 September – The BBC begins regular Digital Audio Broadcasting, from the Crystal Palace transmitting station. Among the channels offered is a relay of events in Parliament.

1996
 No events.

1997
 31 August – Regular programming on the BBC's radio and television stations is abandoned to provide ongoing news coverage of the death of Diana, Princess of Wales. Radio 4 airs a special programme from BBC Radio News which is also carried on BBC Radio 2, BBC Radio 3 and BBC Radio 5 Live.
 6 September – Live coverage of the funeral of Princess Diana is broadcast on all of the BBC national radio networks, as well as on all BBC Local and National radio stations.

1998
 22 March – 5 Live's late night news bulletin News Extra and phone-in/talk show After Hours are broadcast for the final time. The next day a new three hour late show called Late Night Live launches and Up All Night is extended to become a four-hour show.
 6 April – As part of an extensive shake-up to BBC Radio 4's schedules, the weekday editions of The Today programme are extended by 30 minutes to three hours., a Saturday edition of PM is launched and The Week in Westminster is replaced by a new programme, broadcast on Sunday late evenings called The Westminster Hour.
 19 April – A new Sunday morning current affairs programme Broadcasting House launches.

1999
 3 April – The first edition of a weekend world news programme Global is broadcast on Radio 5 Live.
 4 April – Radio 5 Live launches a new "Sunday Service of morning political news".

2000s
2000
14 November – The audio relay on DAB of BBC Parliament closes.

2001
 No events.

2002
6 April – The Weekend News debuts on Radio 5 Live. The new programme replaces Global.
29 April – Wake Up to Money which had previously been part of Morning Reports, becomes a programme in its own right and is extended from 15 to 30 minutes. Consequently, Morning Reports now broadcasts for 30 minutes.
2002 sees the launch of four new digital spin-off stations, two of which carry news. BBC Radio 1Xtra habits own specific news service called 1Xtra News and BBC Radio 6 Music broadcasts news bulletins at half past the hour.

2003
No events.

2004
No events.

2005
No events.

2006
23 April – The Radio 4 UK Theme is used for the last time, amid controversy over its axing by Radio 4 controller Mark Damazer. It is axed to make way for a 'pacy news briefing'.

2007
29 July – Long-running obituary programme Brief Lives is broadcast on Radio 5 Live for the final time.
12 October – iPM is broadcast for the first time. It airs after the Saturday edition of the main programme.

2008
No events.

2009
9 January – The Midday News is broadcast on Radio 5 Live for the final time.

2010s
2010
5 September – Long running evening news programme The Weekend News ends and is replaced by hour-long programmes, including 5 Live Investigates, Pienaar's Politics and a new business show On the Money.

2011
7 November – The World at One is extended from 30 to 45 minutes.

2012
September – Cuts result in BBC Radio 1Xtra losing its news service 1Xtra News. Instead, the station simulcasts the Newsbeat bulletins broadcast on sister station Radio 1 with bespoke bulletins only broadcast during the weekday breakfast show.

2013
16 May – Debut of Question Time Extra Time on BBC Radio 5 Live. The programme, including an audio broadcast of the evening's edition of BBC One's Question Time, is presented by Stephen Nolan and John Pienaar, who take a look at the topics raised by Question Time.

2014
Wake Up to Money on Radio 5 Live is extended from 30 minutes to 45 minutes. Consequently, Morning Reports is shortened from 30 minutes to 15 minutes.

2015
No events.

2016
No events.

2017
No events.

2018
No events.

2019
No events.

2020s
2020
29 January – BBC News announces it will shed 450 posts, including roles from BBC Radio 5 Live, as part of £80m worth of savings being made by the BBC.
20 March – Rhod Sharp presents Up All Night on BBC Radio 5 Live for the final time. He had presented the programme since the station's first night on air, more than 25 years earlier.
23 March – In order to prioritise resources during the COVID-19 pandemic, 5 Live suspends overnight programmes between 1am and 5 am and carries the output of BBC Radio London. This continues until early July when 5 Live resumes its overnight programming on weekdays with Dotun Adebayo replacing Rhod Sharp, and the programme no longer being called Up All Night.
April – Due to COVID-19, BBC Radio 5 Live's news bulletins are shared with BBC Radio 2. Three minute bulletins are broadcast on the hour, with extended five minute bulletins at breakfast and on weekday early evenings.
Having been on air since Radio 5 Live launched, Morning Reports, the 5am news bulletin, is axed as part of cost cutting measures. The bulletin is replaced by an extended Wake Up to Money, which now broadcasts for the full 5am hour.
10 December – BBC Radio 5 Live's Question Time Extra Time is broadcast for the final time.

2021
 9th April – All BBC radio networks interrupt normal schedules to announce the death of Prince Philip, Duke of Edinburgh, interrupting programming at 12:07PM. The programme airs on all networks until around 5pm.

2022
 8 September – Just after Buckingham Palace announces the Death and state funeral of Elizabeth II, all BBC radio stations - local and national - begin broadcasting a special news programme reporting on Her Majesty's death. The programme continues until the following morning, after which stations start to break away from the continuous news coverage.
 19 September – All BBC radio stations broadcast live coverage of the state funeral of Queen Elizabeth II.

See also
Timeline of BBC Television News

References

BBC Radio News